Franjo Palković (16 May 1906 – 12 May 1993) was a Yugoslav wrestler. He competed in the men's Greco-Roman middleweight at the 1928 Summer Olympics.

References

External links
 

1906 births
1993 deaths
Yugoslav male sport wrestlers
Olympic wrestlers of Yugoslavia
Wrestlers at the 1928 Summer Olympics
People from Vojvodina